New England is an unincorporated community and census-designated place (CDP) in Dade County, in the U.S. state of Georgia. It was first listed as a CDP in the 2020 census with a population of 546.

History
An early variant name was "Morrisons Station". The present name, adopted in 1889, is after the northeastern region of New England, the native home of the town's founders. A post office called New England City was established in 1889, and remained in operation until 1907.

The Georgia General Assembly incorporated the place as the "Town of New England City" in 1891.  The town's municipal charter was repealed in 1995.

Demographics

2020 census

Note: the US Census treats Hispanic/Latino as an ethnic category. This table excludes Latinos from the racial categories and assigns them to a separate category. Hispanics/Latinos can be of any race.

References

Former municipalities in Georgia (U.S. state)
Census-designated places in Dade County, Georgia
Populated places disestablished in 1995